Alex Saniel (born 8 November 1996) is a Vanuatuan footballer who plays as a forward for New Zealander Club Franklin United and the Vanuatu national team.

Club career
Saniel started his career with the Teouma Academy, the national academy of Vanuatu. After stints with Yatel and Spirit 08 he went to New Zealand to play with the Fencibles United. In the end of 2016 after the season with Fencibles he returned home, where he immediately joined Ifira Black Bird for the Super League. In 2017 he returned to the Fencibles with whom he won the 2017 Lotto Sport Italia NRFL Division 2. After that he joined Shepherds United in August 2017 to make a chance for the Vanuatu national football team. In 2019 he played for Papatoetoe AFC in Lotto Sport Italia NRFL Conference League. He also defended Fijian club Lautoka in 2019 Pacific Cup. In November 2019, it was announced that Alex Saniel is going to play for Franklin United in 2020.

National team
In 2017 Saniel was called up for the Vanuatu national football team. He made his debut on November 23, 2017, in a 1–0 loss against Estonia when he played the whole 90 minutes.

International goals
Scores and results list Vanuatu's goal tally first.

References

Vanuatuan footballers
Association football defenders
Vanuatu international footballers
Living people
1996 births
Vanuatu youth international footballers
Vanuatu under-20 international footballers
Yatel F.C. players
Spirit 08 F.C. players
Shepherds United F.C. players